This article gives an overview of the aquatic communities in the British National Vegetation Classification system.

Introduction

The aquatic communities of the NVC were described in Volume 4 of British Plant Communities, first published in 1995, along with the swamps and tall-herb fens.

In total, 24 aquatic communities have been identified. 

The aquatic communities fall into the following six groups:
 four communities of the water surface and sub-surface, in which duckweeds and/or Frogbit are the constant species; these communities (A1, A2, A3 and A4) are found in moderately-rich to eutrophic standing waters
 eight free-floating or rooted and submerged, pondweed communities (A5, A6, A11, A12, A13, A14, A15 and A21)
 six communities in which rooted water-lilies and pondweeds with floating leaves are the constant species (A7, A8, A9, A10, A19 and A20)
 three communities in which water-crowfoots and/or starworts are the constant species (A16, A17 and A18)
 two hairgrass and quillwort communities (A22 and A23)
 a single community characterised by free-floating vegetation found in impoverished base-poor standing waters (A24).

List of aquatic communities
The following is a list of the communities that make up this category:
 A1 Lemna gibba community Lemnetum gibbae Miyawaki & J. Tx. 1960
 A2 Lemna minor community Lemnetum minoris Soó 1947
 A3 Spirodela polyrhiza - Hydrocharis morsus-ranae community
 A4 Hydrocharis morsus-ranae - Stratiotes aloides community
 A5 Ceratophyllum demersum community Certaophylletum demersi Hild 1956
 A6 Ceratophyllum submersum community Certaophylletum submersi Den Hartog & Segal 1964
 A7 Nymphaea alba community Nymphaeetum albae Oberdorfer & Mitarb. 1967
 A8 Nuphar lutea community
 A9 Potamogeton natans community
 A10 Polygonum amphibium community
 A11 Potamogeton pectinatus - Myriophyllum spicatum community
 A12 Potamogeton pectinatus community
 A13 Potamogeton perfoliatus - Myriophyllum alterniflorum community
 A14 Myriophyllum alterniflorum community Myriophylletum alterniflori
 A15 Elodea canadensis community
 A16 Callitriche stagnalis community
 A17 Ranunculus penicillatus ssp. pseudofluitans community
 A18 Ranunculus fluitans community Ranunculetum fluitantis Allorge 1922
 A19 Ranunculus aquatilis community Ranunculetum aquatilis Géhu 1961
 A20 Ranunculus peltatus community Ranunculetum peltati Sauer 1947
 A21 Ranunculus baudotii community Ranunculetum baudotii Br.-Bl. 1952
 A22 Littorella uniflora - Lobelia dortmanna community
 A23 Isoetes lacustris/setacea community
 A24 Juncus bulbosus community.